Tachi Palace Fights 7: Deck the Halls was a mixed martial arts event held by Tachi Palace Fights on December 2, 2010 at the Tachi Palace Hotel & Casino in Lemoore, California.

Background
Chance Farrar was expected to fight at this event against Tommy Vargas, but due to a knee injury he was replaced by Martin Sandoval.

Poppies Martinez suffered an undisclosed injury and was replaced by Ultimate Fighter veteran Seth Baczynski, who will fight Martinez's original opponent, Tim McKenzie.

Jesse Wallace also suffered a knee injury training for his fight against Mike Guidry and was replaced by Jimmy Ambriz.

Micah Miller was to challenge for Jorge DeJesus's featherweight belt, but Miller weighed in 1.2 lbs over the limit, and the bout was changed to a non-title matchup.

Results

References

See also
 Tachi Palace Fights
 2010 in Tachi Palace Fights

Tachi Palace Fights events
2010 in mixed martial arts
Mixed martial arts in California
Sports in Lemoore, California
2010 in sports in California